Francisco José de Mercado (ca. 1762ca. 1842) was interim mayor of Ponce, Puerto Rico, from early in 1822 to 31 December 1822.

Background
Mercado was the son of Joseph de Mercado, who was "Alcalde de la Santa Hermandad" in 1757 (San German) and teniente a guerra (Ponce) in 1763.

Mayoral term
While acting as the maximum civil authority in Ponce during 1822, Mercado was interim mayor. As such, he was finishing off José Molina's term as a constitutional mayor. Mercado took over leadership of the town from Jose Ortiz de la Renta and, at the end of his term, handed over leadership to Jose Ortiz de la Renta again. There are no Acts in the Municipality of Ponce for the period 1824 to 1834, affecting the period while he was mayor as well.

See also

 List of Puerto Ricans
 List of mayors of Ponce, Puerto Rico

References

Further reading
 Ramon Marin. Las Fiestas Populares de Ponce. Editorial Universidad de Puerto Rico. 1994.

External links
 Guardia Civil española (c. 1898) (Includes military ranks in 1880s Spanish Empire.)

Mayors of Ponce, Puerto Rico
1760s births
1840s deaths
Year of death uncertain
Year of birth uncertain